Cotyachryson philippii is a species of round-necked longhorns beetle belonging to the family Cerambycidae, subfamily Cerambycinae.

Distribution
This species can be found in Chile.

References
 
 
 

Achrysonini
Beetles described in 1925
Endemic fauna of Chile